"Catchu Catchu" is a song by French hip-hop singer Lartiste taken from his album Grandestino. The song has peaked at number 7 on the French Singles Chart.

Charts

References

2017 singles
2017 songs
French-language songs